Kim MacDougall (born August 29, 1954) is a Canadian retired professional ice hockey defenceman who played in one National Hockey League game for the Minnesota North Stars during the 1974–75 season, on March 5, 1975 against the Philadelphia Flyers. The rest of his career, which lasted from 1974 to 1976, was spent in the minor leagues.

Career statistics

Regular season and playoffs

See also
 List of players who played only one game in the NHL

External links
 

1954 births
Living people
Canadian expatriate ice hockey players in the United States
Canadian ice hockey defencemen
Columbus Owls players
Fort Wayne Komets players
Ice hockey people from Saskatchewan
Minnesota North Stars draft picks
Minnesota North Stars players
New Haven Nighthawks players
Regina Pats players
Sportspeople from Regina, Saskatchewan
Winnipeg Jets (WHA) draft picks